The Cornell Prize was the major contemporary art prize offered in South Australia and was presented as an exhibition by the Contemporary Art Society of South Australia from 1951 to 1965. It was administered by the Cornell family. Several of the prize-winning paintings were subsequently acquired by the Art Gallery of South Australia.

Winners include:
Wladyslaw Dutkiewicz (Summertime, 1951 and Orient, 1955)
Douglas Roberts (Connoisseurs, 1952)
Ludwik Dutkiewicz (Boats after Storm, 1953 and Green Village 1954)
Francis Roy Thompson (Design with Coloured people, 1956) 
Stanislaw Ostoja-Kotkowski (Form in Landscape, 1957 and Buildings, 1959)
Jacqueline Hick (Lost tribe, 1958 and Corridor, 1960)
 Barbara Hanrahan (1961)
Udo Sellbach (1962)
Geoff Wilson (1963)
Franz Kempf (1964)
Lynn Collins (1965)

Footnotes

References

Australian art awards
Awards established in 1951
Awards disestablished in 1965